is a Japanese anime television series produced by the animation study Passione. The series' first season aired in Japan between October and December 2012, and a second season aired between April and June 2013. 

The series was written by Hiroshi Kimura, and written by Kenji Konuta, with original character design by illustrator POP (ぽっぷ). It originally aired on the local Ryukyu Asahi Broadcasting station in October 2012.

The comedy animated series consists of 26 three-minute episodes and follows Nanafa Kyan, a cheerful middle school girl who helps run the "Kame Soba" with her grandmother, younger sister, and older sister. Their peaceful life begins to change when supernatural spirits are unleashed from a nearby Chinese banyan tree.

References

External links
 Official website 
 

2012 anime television series debuts
2013 anime television series debuts
Passione (company)